Stazzema is a comune (municipality) in the Province of Lucca in the Italian region Tuscany, located about  northwest of Florence and about  northwest of Lucca.

History

During World War II, the village of Sant'Anna di Stazzema was the site of a massacre of civil population by German SS soldiers and the Italian Black Brigades (12 August 1944). A total of 560 people were killed, among them 100 children, one of them only 20 days old. The city received the Gold Medal for Military Valour after the war.

Geography
Stazzema borders the following municipalities: Camaiore, Careggine, Massa, Molazzana, Pescaglia, Pietrasanta, Seravezza, Vagli Sotto, Vergemoli.

Frazioni
Stazzema is composed of 17 hamlets (frazioni):

Arni, Cardoso, Farnocchia, Gallena, La Culla, Levigliani, Mulina, Palagnana, Pomezzana, Pontestazzemese, Pruno, Retignano, Ruosina, Sant'Anna, Stazzema, Terrinca, and Volegno. Despite municipal name, the town hall is not located in Stazzema, but in the nearby hamlet of Pontestazzemese.

References

External links

 Official website
 Sant'Anna di Stazzema unofficial website

Cities and towns in Tuscany